Euplica varians is a species of  sea snail, a marine gastropod mollusk in the family Columbellidae, the dove snails. It is known as Momi in Hawaii, which translates to "pearl". The shells of this species are commonly used in leis in Ni'ihau.

Description
Euplica varians grows up to 11 mm long.

Distribution
This species is found in the Indian Ocean along the East African coast and along northern KwaZuluNatal, in the Indo-West Pacific and Australia.

Habitat
Euplica varians lives in shallow intertidal waters.

References

External links
 

Columbellidae
Niihau
Gastropods described in 1832